Infant Island is the first studio album by American screamo band Infant Island. The album was released on August 1, 2018, through Middle-Man Records, Conditions Records, and Dingleberry Records. It was produced by Thomas Carney in Richmond, Virginia. Several songs from the album are re-recordings of songs which originally appeared on miscellaneous split EPs from years prior. The album was critically acclaimed at the time of its release, and was described as delivering "new life to screamo" by The Washington Post.

Track listing

Personnel 
Infant Island personnel adapted from LP liner notes.

Infant Island 

 Daniel Kost – vocals
 Alexander Rudenshiold – guitar, vocals
 Kyle Guerra – bass
 James Rakestraw – drums

Additional Instrumentation 

 Mark Boulanger – field recording
 Drake Dragone – violin
 Grace Howie – cello
 Alexander Rudenshiold – celestette, grand piano
 Austin O’Rourke – grand piano, upright piano, bowed glockenspiel, tape processing

Technical Credits 

 Thomas Carney – engineering, recording, mixing, mastering
 Drake Dragone – overdub engineering

References 

2018 debut albums
Infant Island albums
Shoegaze albums by American artists